Aleksandra M. Walczak is a theoretical biophysicist. She works on stochastic gene expression at Ecole Normale Supérieure where she is a research director.

Education 
Walczak completed her masters degree at Warsaw University, Poland in 2002, her PhD at University of California, San Diego in 2007, and was a post-doc until 2010 at Princeton University.

Honours 
2014 - Grand Prix Jacques Herbrand de l’Académie des sciences (Jacques Herbrand Prize)
2016 - CNRS Bronze medal
2021 - Fellow of the American Physical Society for "insightful theoretical work on the physics of genetic networks, collective animal behavior, and especially the origins and functionality of antibody diversity, thus setting an agenda for a generation."
 2021 - Prix Jean Ricard awarded by the Société française de physique

Selected publications

References

External links 

Homepage
Aleksandra Walczak: Predictability of viral-host co-evolution
QBio Profile

Living people
Biophysicists
Women biophysicists
Fellows of the American Physical Society
University of California, San Diego alumni
University of Warsaw alumni
Research directors of the French National Centre for Scientific Research
Academic staff of the École Normale Supérieure
Year of birth missing (living people)